Ralph Braibanti (1920 - November 24, 2005) was the James B. Duke Professor of political science at Duke University, and was known for his work in Islamic studies; his work focused on Pakistan. He founded the American Institute of Pakistan Studies and served as its President for nine years.

Braibanti was born 1920 in Danbury, Connecticut of Italian and Polish heritage and taught at Syracuse University and Kenyon College before coming to Duke. He died in 2005.

References

External links 
 Braibanti's Duke obituary 

American political scientists
Duke University faculty
1920 births
2005 deaths
Syracuse University faculty
Kenyon College faculty
20th-century political scientists